The 2016 Super T20 Provincial Tournament is the sixth edition of the Inter-Provincial Twenty20. The tournament featured a different format from previous seasons, featuring five teams, and was held between 26 January and 5 February 2016. Colombo Commandos won the tournament, defeat Galle Guardians in the final by 8 wickets.

Format
The Tournament will comprise 10 Round-robin matches plus the two semi-finals and the final. All first Round-robin matches and semi finals were held as day games and the final as a day/night game.

Teams

Venue
All the matches will be played at R Premadasa Stadium, Colombo.

Points table

(C) = Eventual Champion; (R) = Runner-up.

Fixtures

Match 1

Match 2

Match 3

Match 4

Match 5

Match 6

Match 7

Match 8

Match 9

Match 10

Semi-finals

Semifinal 1

Semifinal 2

Finals

Match 13

Statistics

Highest Team Totals
The following table lists the five highest team scores during this season.

Last Updated 5 February 2016.

Most Runs
The top five highest run scorers (total runs) in the season are included in this table.

Last Updated 5 February 2016.

Most Wickets
The following table contains the five leading wicket-takers of the season.

Last Updated 5 February 2016.

References

External links
 Tournament Page – Cricinfo

Inter-Provincial Twenty20
Inter-Provincial Twenty20
2016 in Sri Lankan cricket